Bø Church may refer to several places:

Bø Church (Hyllestad), a church in Hyllestad municipality, Sogn og Fjordane county, Norway
Bø Church (Nordland), a church in Bø municipality, Nordland county, Norway
Bø Church (Telemark), a church in Bø municipality, Telemark county, Norway
Old Bø Church, a historic church in Bø municipality, Telemark county, Norway